"" ("Freedom") is the national anthem of Georgia. It was adopted as the Georgian national anthem in May 2004, along with a new national flag and coat of arms. The symbols' change was brought about upon the successful overthrow of the previous government in the bloodless Rose Revolution. The music, taken from the Georgian operas Abesalom da Eteri ("Abesalom and Eteri") and Daisi ("The Nightfall"), by the Georgian composer Zacharia Paliashvili, was adapted to form it by Ioseb Kechakmadze. The lyrics were composed by David Magradze.

History 
The current Georgian national anthem was adopted by the Parliament of Georgia on 20 May 2004, exactly five months after the resignation of President Eduard Shevardnadze in the Rose Revolution. A bill was introduced in the first plenary meeting of the sixth convocation of the Georgian Parliament on 22 April 2004. The bill to adopt "Tavisupleba" as Georgia's national anthem was presented by the Minister of Culture Giorgi Gabashvili; in which the music was played for the deputies soon afterwards. The law does not give any regulations, but refers to the corresponding Presidential Decree.

"Tavisupleba" succeeded the old national anthem "Dideba", which was in use by the Democratic Republic of Georgia from 1918 to 1921, and again by the newly independent (from the Soviet Union) Georgia from 1990 to 2004.

The new national anthem quickly gained popularity in contrast to its predecessor, whose lyrics were somewhat archaic and difficult to memorize.

During U.S. President George W. Bush's visit to Georgia in May 2005, he along with President Mikheil Saakashvili was addressing tens of thousands of Georgians in Freedom Square, Tbilisi when a recording of "Tavisupleba" failed to play properly. Saakashvili then motioned to the choirs, and thousands in the crowd joined the singers in singing it, a moment which was described by media as "the most powerful moment of the day".

Music 
The music of "Tavisupleba" was adapted from two Georgian operas, Abesalom da Eteri (1918) and Daisi (1923), composed by Zacharia Paliashvili, the father of the Georgian classical music genre.

Lyrics

Georgian lyrics

Abkhaz lyrics

English translations

Regulations 
According to the Regulations for the Parliament of Georgia, Chapter 3, Article 4.5., the national anthem of Georgia is played at the opening and closing of each session. It is also performed following the signing of the Oath of the Parliamentarian after the Parliament recognizes the authority of at least two-thirds of its newly elected members (Chapter 25, Article 124.7). The anthem is also played prior to the annual report of the President of Georgia to the Parliament.

Georgian Public Broadcaster airs a music video version of the anthem, featuring opera singer Paata Burchuladze.

Notes

References

External links 

  Parliament of Georgia Lyrics
  President of Georgia Lyrics and media
 Georgia: Tavisupleba - Audio of the national anthem of Georgia, with information and lyrics (archive link)
 "Tavisupleba: The Georgian National Anthem," From the Cradle of Wine
 Sheet music - SATB and Piano score of Tavisupleba on IMSLP

National anthems
National symbols of Georgia (country)
Georgian words and phrases
European anthems
Asian anthems
Compositions by Zacharia Paliashvili
National anthem compositions in B-flat major